Mounira Bhar is a Tunisian filmmaker. She holds a Master of Advanced Studies in aesthetic philosophy obtained at the Sorbonne.

Filmography

Feature films 

 2002: El Kotbia (La Librairie)

Short films 

 1989 : L’union sacrée
 1992 : Itineraire
 1993 : Kenz 
 1998 : Couplouètes

References 

Living people
Year of birth missing (living people)
Tunisian film directors